The Sierra de la Giganta is a mountain range of eastern Baja California Sur state, located on the southern Baja California Peninsula in northwestern Mexico.

It is a mountain range of the Peninsular Ranges System, which extends  from Southern California, through the Baja California Peninsula in Baja California and Baja California Sur states.

Geography
The Sierra de la Giganta extends along the southeastern Baja California Peninsula, parallel and close to the coast of the Gulf of California—Sea of Cortez.

The range runs from Loreto in Loreto Municipality west of Loreto, southwards to  La Paz Municipality northwest of La Paz.

Ecology
The range is predominantly covered in dry (or xeric) shrubland. The Baja California Desert ecoregion covers the Pacific (western) slope of the range, and the Gulf of California xeric scrub ecoregion covers the gulf (eastern) slope. Stream valleys with year-round water sustain palm oases, with groves of the native palm Washingtonia robusta and other moisture-loving plants.

See also

References

External links
Flickr photo set: Sierra de la Giganta

Giganta
Peninsular Ranges
La Paz Municipality (Baja California Sur)
Loreto Municipality (Baja California Sur)
Important Bird Areas of Mexico